Le Guen is Breton surname, the word comes from gwenn, meaning white or blessed (figurative meaning) in Breton.

People
Gilles Le Guen, French jihadist
Jacques Le Guen, member of the National Assembly of France
Jean-Marie Le Guen, member of the National Assembly of France
Paul Le Guen, former international football defender and coach

See also
 Saint-Guen
 Ursula K. Le Guin

Surnames of Breton origin
Breton-language surnames